Chandrapur Bagicha is a census town in Kamrup district  in the state of Assam, India.

Demographics
 India census, Chandrapur Bagicha had a population of 5230. Males constitute 55% of the population and females 45%. Chandrapur Bagicha has an average literacy rate of 73%, higher than the national average of 59.5%; with male literacy of 78% and female literacy of 66%. 11% of the population is under 6 years of age.

References

Cities and towns in Kamrup district